The Porter Hollow Embankment and Culvert, also known as the Grand Rapids and Indiana Railroad Culvert, is a stone bridge and trestle over the Stegman Creek along the White Pine Trail in Algoma Township, Michigan.

History 
The Grand Rapids and Indiana Railroad completed its railway through Algoma Township in 1867. Porter Hollow was an unincorporated community along this route, about 3 miles north of Rockford. At Porter Hollow the railroad built a large wooden trestle over Stegman Creek, then known as Wicked Creek. In 1883 a flood damaged the trestle, and a local farmer, James House, collected field stones to build the current trestle over the creek. The railroad ceased operations in 1985, and in the 1990s the Michigan Department of Natural Resources redeveloped the railroad right-of-way into a paved hiking and bicycling trail known as the White Pine Trail.

Today 
That stone bridge withstood the rigors of railroad use for nearly a century, and it is in good condition today. The trestle is listed on the National Register of Historic Places, and is a key bridge along the White Pine Trail. The Algoma Township Trestle Culvert was designated as a Michigan Historic Civil Engineering Landmark by the American Society of Civil Engineers in 2005.

Description
The Porter Hollow embankment is a 1400-foot-long earth structure, which contains a stone arch culvert passing over Stegman Creek. The culvert is made of cut fieldstone, and measures nineteen feet in width, seventy-five feet in length, and passes about nineteen feet above the water level in the creek below. The stonework rises six feet above the top of the arch, and continues onto wingwalls at each end. The top of the culvert is blacktopped as part of the trail. An unusual feature of the culvert is that the bed of the creek below the culvert is lined with wooden planks.

See also

References

External links
Images from HistoricBridges.org

Transportation buildings and structures in Kent County, Michigan
Railroad bridges on the National Register of Historic Places in Michigan
Bridges completed in 1885
Railroad bridges in Michigan
National Register of Historic Places in Kent County, Michigan
Trestle bridges in the United States
Stone arch bridges in the United States